The Kol uprising, Kol rebellion, also known in British records as the Kol mutiny was a revolt of the tribal Kol people of Chhota Nagpur that took place between 1831 and 1832. It was due to economic exploitation brought on by the systems of land tenure and administration that had been introduced by the East India Company. Tribal people of Chotanagpur including Mundas, Oraons, Hos and Bhumijs were called Kols. They initially plunded and killed Sikh and muslims thikedars who collected taxes by different means. Later they also started to plunders and kill Hindus of nearby villages and burnt their houses. The insurgency was suppressed by killing of the leaders, their followers and arrest of many leaders by Thomas Wilkinson.

Background
In 18th century, Nagvanshi king Maninath Shah (1748-1762) consolidated his authority over the estates of 
Bundu, Silli, Barwe, Rahe, Tamar and the chief of these estates were compelled to 
acknowledge the Nagvanshi ruler as their Chief. These chief were known as Mankis of these area. During 19th century, some Mankis revolted after being disposed by Nagvanshi and appointment of Thikedars to collect taxes due to fulfill debt of Nagvanshi. These Mankis and their followers attacked the other Mankis of area, looted and burnt down houses of thikedars as well as plundered and destroyed villages of Hindus.

The uprising was a reaction to the appointment of a Political Agent to the Government in South Bihar and recently ceded districts nearby around 1819. This resulted in many people moving into these areas which were the lands of numerous aboriginal tribes. These tribes ruled by Munda-Manki system. With the application of new land laws, the Kols were exploited by outsiders moving into the area and commercial activities. Another irritation was the taxation on the movement of products such as salt that were formerly freely moved. Corrupt official practices and lawlessness followed. When some Mankis disposed, Mankis and their followers plundered and burnt the houses of the newly settled people as well as nearby villages of hindus in revenge.

Insurgency
Harinath Shahi, the brother of Nagvanshi king Jagannath Shah Deo granted lands to some Sikh horse traders and Muslim cloth merchant to collect taxes Sonpur Pargana due to debts. The twelve villages belongs to Singrai Manki and Mohan Manki. Then the Manki disposed  and their two sisters seduced by Sikhs and kept as concubine. The twelve villages of Byjunath Manki were given to Hussain Khan and he send the Manki to Police of Govindpur and send to jail in Sherghati. The thikedars were collecting taxes by different means such as Abwabs, Salami etc. Then Munda of the region convened a meeting and started looting, burning houses, killings of Sikhs and muslims. The houses of Saifullah Khan, Muhammad Ali Naik, Zafar Ali Khan were looted and killed. Then they also started to plundering houses and killings of Hindus of nearby villages. Then Oraon and Ho also joined in the insurgency in at attempt to destroy Sad (Sadan) or Hindus and Diku or foreigners. According to colonel Edward Tuite Dalton, In every Paragana the villages in which Sads (Sadan/Hindus) resided 
were destroyed and all Dikus (foreigners) who fell into the 
hands of the insurgents were murdered. The Zamindars of Rahe, Bundu, Tamar, and Barwa, though neither Sads nor 
Dikus, narrowly escaped with their lives, when those places 
were all sacked and destroyed.

Then it spread to other area of Ranchi district. They indulged in plunder and killings. They attacked non-tribal of the region, the Sadan people. The situation continue for several months.
They also destroyed Mahamaya temple which was built by Nagvanshi king Gajghat Rai and killed the wife and children of the caretaker of temple Barju Ram. He has described the incident in a Nagpuri poem. 

British historiography described the Kol uprising as banditry. In 1831, the Kol tribesmen of Chhota Nagpur, who were upset over exploitation by agents of the East India Company (EIC), rose in revolt against the EIC. The Kols rebels under the leadership of Budhu Bhagat, Joa Bhagat, Jhindrai Manki, Madara Mahato, Buli Mahato and others. The Kols grew restive over the increasing encroachment on tribal territories by the non-tribals like Hindus, Muslims and Sikhs. The new non-tribal landlords resorted to forced labour, fines, and often confiscated their cattle. The Kol insurrection started in 1831 when the farm of two Sikh thikadar (contractors) was plundered and burnt. In 1832, there were clashes between the armed forces and the tribals Kols rebels. Kharwar and Chero also joined in the uprisings. Professor Sunil Sen mentions that in a memorable guerilla campaign Budhu Bhagat and his followers fought with primitive weapons such as bows and arrows. According to British, Kols people restored in indiscriminately attacking Hindus, Muslim and other foreigner people, plundered and burnt their houses.

Thomas Wilkinson supressed the activity. He killed many leaders of insurgency and their followers. In 14 February 1932, he killed Bhagat Singh, a munda leader, his seven sons and his 150 followers in village of Sillagaon. Captain Wilkinson encamped in Tamar. He summoned the chief of Bundu, Tamar who were Munda as well as king of Chotanagpur and dicided to kept away Lakra Kol (Hos) from the region. The Rautia of the Sundari, Khunti, Torpa and other places conferred title of Baraik to Thomas Wilkinson. Then Wilkinson went to Porahat and made some Hos friend and succeeded in capturing the leader of the kol insurgency Dasai Manki in 1936. Katey 
and Binji Rai captured when they were enjoying dinner party, then they were taken to Kolkata in chain.

Aftermath
After the insurgency, British created division of South-West Frontier with its headquarter at Lohardaga which was later shifted to Kishunpur now Ranchi and established police station in different areas. According to British report, the insurgency was result of disposition of some Mankis and their mistreatment at the hands of thikedars as well as the different rents imposition by Company on masses of whom majority were poor with half savage mentality.

See also
 Santhal rebellion
 Budhu Bhagat

References

Further reading

History of Jharkhand
Rebellions in India
Conflicts in 1831
Conflicts in 1832
1831 in British India
1832 in British India
Conflicts in 1833
1833 in British India